Asyraf is a Malay given name.

Notable people with this given name include:
 Amar Asyraf (born 1986), Malaysian actor
 Amirul Asyraf Suhaidi (born 1994), Malaysian football player
 Asyraf Wajdi Dusuki (born 1976), Malaysian politician
 Famirul Asyraf Sayuti (born 1989), Malaysian football player
 Khairul Asyraf (footballer, born December 1994), Malaysian footballer for Penang
 Khairul Asyraf (footballer, born March 1994), Malaysian footballer for UiTM
 Muhd Asyraf Azan (born 1988), Malaysian squash player